Gianbattista Alfonsetti (9 October 1929 – 21 July 2004) was an Italian boxer. He competed in the men's light heavyweight event at the 1952 Summer Olympics.

References

1929 births
2004 deaths
Italian male boxers
Olympic boxers of Italy
Boxers at the 1952 Summer Olympics
Mediterranean Games medalists in boxing
Light-heavyweight boxers
Boxers at the 1951 Mediterranean Games
Mediterranean Games gold medalists for Italy
20th-century Italian people